Cauchas sedella is a moth of the Adelidae family or fairy longhorn moths. It was described by August Busck in 1915. It is found in North America, including Colorado.

References

Adelidae
Moths described in 1915
Moths of North America